Słotwina may refer to the following places in Poland:
Słotwina, Lower Silesian Voivodeship (south-west Poland)
Słotwina, Żywiec County in Silesian Voivodeship (south Poland)